Glentunnel (previously known as Surveyors Gully) is a village located in the Selwyn District of the Canterbury region of New Zealand's South Island.  

It has a close historical association with coal, clay and sand mines of the Malvern area. Originally named ‘Surveyors Gully’, Glentunnel, derived from the tramway tunnel in the glen that gave access to the Homebush coal mine. Coal was discovered in 1871, along with deposits of fine clay, which lead to the establishment of a brick, tile and pottery works that survived until the 1980s.

History

1800s–2000s 

Glentunnel was served by the Whitecliffs Branch, a branch line railway, from the line's opening on 3 November 1875 through to its closure on 31 March 1962. However, the station was not open until 22 April 1876. Few remnants of the railway remain in the town, with the station's platform incorporated into the backyard of a private residence.

St Luke's Anglican church used to be situated on the corner of State Highway 77 and Victoria Street. The church was built in 1904, but it caught fire in the 1970s which caused partial damage to the building. It was later demolished. The grounds are now privately owned.

2000–2010 
On 18 June 2003, the Glentunnel Community Hall was set alight, causing major damage. The Malvern Record reports: "At approximately 2.15am on Wednesday the 18th of June the alarm was raised to a fire at the Glentunnel Hall. The call was made by a person travelling through to Invercargill. 

When units arrived on the scene the fire had a good hold on the building with the entire building being engulfed in flames. Four units attended the callout; two from Coalgate and two from Darfield. Also in attendance was a water tanker from the local council. The fire was brought under control within 15 minutes of the units arriving, with the fire being fully extinguished within an hour. 

The damage from the road is hard to detect but as you can see from the photographs the damage to the hall is extensive with the entire building being gutted. This is a big loss for the Glentunnel Community."

On 28 January 2006, the new community centre was opened, replacing the former hall.

2010 Canterbury earthquake 

The historic Homebush Homestead, located four kilometres east from Glentunnel was extensively damaged by the 2010 Canterbury earthquake, so much so that it has been described as being "practically in ruins". It was later demolished and a new homestead was built on the same site. The bell tower of the historic St John's Church (built in 1911) partially collapsed, causing damage to the nave and destroying the organ.

2020s–present 
In May 2021, the Hororata Golf Course (located in Glentunnel) suffered server damage caused by flooding from the breached Selwyn River, with it being "largely unrecognisable" as a result. The camping grounds were also evacuated, with campervans and cabins being washed away. It is thought that it would take weeks to repair the damage.

Demographics

The settlement had a population of 162 at the 2018 New Zealand census, an increase of 12 people (8.0%) since the 2013 census, and an increase of 21 people (14.9%) since the 2006 census. There were 69 households. There were 75 males and 87 females, giving a sex ratio of 0.86 males per female. The median age was 50.0 years (compared with 37.4 years nationally), with 27 people (16.7%) aged under 15 years, 21 (13.0%) aged 15 to 29, 84 (51.9%) aged 30 to 64, and 30 (18.5%) aged 65 or older.

Ethnicities were 96.3% European/Pākehā, 5.6% Māori, 3.7% Asian, and 3.7% other ethnicities (totals add to more than 100% since people could identify with multiple ethnicities).

Although some people objected to giving their religion, 59.3% had no religion, 27.8% were Christian and 1.9% had other religions.

Of those at least 15 years old, 18 (13.3%) people had a bachelor or higher degree, and 33 (24.4%) people had no formal qualifications. The median income was $26,100, compared with $31,800 nationally. The employment status of those at least 15 was that 60 (44.4%) people were employed full-time, 27 (20.0%) were part-time, and 3 (2.2%) were unemployed.

Glentunnel statistical area

Glentunnel statistical area had a population of 1,191 at the 2018 New Zealand census, an increase of 84 people (7.6%) since the 2013 census, and an increase of 300 people (33.7%) since the 2006 census. There were 486 households. There were 585 males and 606 females, giving a sex ratio of 0.97 males per female. The median age was 44.8 years (compared with 37.4 years nationally), with 216 people (18.1%) aged under 15 years, 171 (14.4%) aged 15 to 29, 618 (51.9%) aged 30 to 64, and 189 (15.9%) aged 65 or older.

Ethnicities were 96.0% European/Pākehā, 6.0% Māori, 1.5% Pacific peoples, 0.8% Asian, and 1.8% other ethnicities (totals add to more than 100% since people could identify with multiple ethnicities).

The proportion of people born overseas was 16.9%, compared with 27.1% nationally.

Although some people objected to giving their religion, 58.2% had no religion, 31.2% were Christian, 0.3% were Buddhist and 1.5% had other religions.

Of those at least 15 years old, 171 (17.5%) people had a bachelor or higher degree, and 222 (22.8%) people had no formal qualifications. The median income was $35,100, compared with $31,800 nationally. The employment status of those at least 15 was that 525 (53.8%) people were employed full-time, 177 (18.2%) were part-time, and 27 (2.8%) were unemployed.

Ecology 
Joyce Reserve is a part of a Canterbury Plain-wide vision for a network of native forest. A total of 100,000 native trees have been planted by local school children and other volunteers. The aim is to encourage native birds to repopulate the region, as well as have a safe 'green path' from the Southern Alps to Lake Ellesmere, in between the two rivers (Rakaia and Waimakariri). Thus far, kingfishers, bellbirds, and waxeyes have inhabited the area.

Recreation 

Glentunnel has many recreational walkways. These include the River Walk, a walkway that follows the Selwyn River from the camping ground to the one-lane bridge at the western end of Glentunnel, and the Millennium Walkway, which follows a now, non-existent tramway route up to the disused tunnel which gave the township its name. This walkway was opened in 2000. 

Glentunnel also has a domain, where cricket, football or rugby can be played. To the south of the domain is the Glentunnel camping ground, which is popular during the summer months for its location next to the Selwyn River.

Adjacent to the domain is the Hororata Golf Club.

Education 
Glentunnel Primary School is Glentunnel's sole primary school, established in 1879. It has  students as of  ranging from years 1 to 6.

Industry

Mining 
Industrial activity such as lignite coal mining used to take place in the region around Glentunnel. This was one reason as to why the railway was built, but industrial activity declined sharply in the 20th century and has been effectively non-existent since the 1980s. However, one open-pit coal mine is still operated by Bathurst Resources Limited.

Brickworks 
The Glentunnel Brickworks was located at the end of Philip Street, operating from 1875 until its closure on 31 October 1983. They were manufactures of bricks, tiles and pottery. Products from the brickworks were used to build the Homebush Homestead, as well as other farm buildings around the Deans' Homebush station.

Services  
Glentunnel has a general store. Two churches are also located here: a Brethren Church and a combined denominational church of Anglican, Methodist and Presbyterian. Cafés, a community centre, garage, library, museum, playground and a post office are also located in the village.

The New Zealand Army has an ammunitions storage facility in Glentunnel.

Footnotes

Bibliography
David Leitch and Brian Scott, Exploring New Zealand's Ghost Railways, revised edition (Wellington: Grantham House, 1998 [1995]), 71-2.

References

External links

Selwyn District
Populated places in Canterbury, New Zealand